PY Ta 641, sometimes known as the Tripod Tablet, is a Mycenaean clay tablet inscribed in Linear B, currently displayed in the National Archaeological Museum, Athens. Discovered in the so-called 'Archives Complex' of the Palace of Nestor at Pylos in Messenia in June 1952 by the American archaeologist Carl Blegen, it has been described as "probably the most famous tablet of Linear B".

The tablet catalogues tripods and other vessels used in ritual feasting. It was inscribed around 1180 BCE by a senior scribe working for the palatial administration at Pylos, known to scholarship as 'Hand 2' and possibly named Phugebris. It is categorised as a palm-leaf tablet — a relatively small tablet used to record a single entry of information — and was probably intended to act as a short-term memory aid, perhaps before its information was transferred to a more permanent means of storage such as paper, parchment or papyrus.

The tablet was accidentally fired when the Palace of Nestor was destroyed by fire around 1180 BCE, less than a year after its production. It has been used as evidence for the workings of the palatial administration, as well as about feasting in the Mycenaean world and the connections between Pylos and Crete in the Late Bronze Age.

The tablet was first published after Michael Ventris proposed, in June 1952, a decipherment of Linear B and that the Mycenaean language was a dialect of Greek. PY Ta 641 includes easily-recognised ideograms depicting the vessels it describes, which closely matched the translation of the associated text predicted by Ventris' decipherment. While the facts of its discovery and translation were disputed throughout the 1950s and early 1960s, particularly by the Scottish classicist Arthur J. Beattie, the tablet provided an important early indication of the correctness of the decipherment, and contributed to its general acceptance among Anglophone scholars by the 1980s.

Designation 
The designation 'PY Ta 641' is made up of three parts:
 PY: a site label; PY stands for Pylos.
 Ta: the 'series', itself broken into a capital letter and a lower-case letter. The 'T' refers to the ideograms used in the text, and was used to group the tablets before the Linear B script was deciphered. The 'a' further subdivides the tablets based on their subject matter and was added after the decipherment.
 641: an identifying number, unique within the site.

Production

The writers of Linear B tablets are known in scholarship as 'hands', after the palaeographic method of identifying them by handwriting. They are considered to have been professional scribes. PY Ta 641 was written by 'Hand 2', the third-most attested author in the Pylian corpus, who was also responsible for assessments of taxation and debts (the Ma series) and of allocations of bronze (the Jn series). 

Hand 2 seems to have been a senior administrator, one of four 'chief scribes' (Hands 1, 2, 21 and 41). They may have been subordinate to the main 'archivist' (Hand 1), or may have operated separately: Evangelos Kyriakidis has suggested that Hand 2 was responsible for matters within the palace, while Hand 1 had responsibility for those outside it. In most cases, the names of the Linear B scribes are unknown. However, John Bennet has suggested that pu2-ke-qi-ri (perhaps ), an official recorded on another tablet of the same series (PY Ta 711) as carrying out an inspection of similar vessels for a festival, may also have written the tablets that documented the results of that inspection. Since PY Ta 711 was also written by 'Hand 2', that would make pu2-ke-qi-ri the author of PY Ta 641.

Hand 2 worked primarily in an upstairs storeroom above Room 38 in the eastern part of the palace, along with Hands 4, 41 and S1203 Cii, who all recorded different types of perfumed oil — an industry with which Hand 2 was closely connected. However, Kyriakidis has described Hand 2 as "one of the most ubiquitous people in the central palatial building", since they seem to have moved around most rooms in the northern part of the palace, including the upper floor. Hand 2 may also have been responsible for the training of other, more junior scribes, who were responsible for a more limited range of activities.

It is unclear how far the writers of Linear B tablets made the tablets themselves: matching palm-prints have been found on tablets attributed to different scribal hands, suggesting that they were made by a single person but written by at least one additional person, while other tablets show evidence of being physically reworked during the writing process —  for example, being squeezed so as to slightly expand the writing surface, when the scribe realised that additional space was needed. 

Linear B tablets divide into larger page-shaped and smaller, wider palm-leaf tablets. PY Ta 641 is a palm-leaf tablet, which were generally used to record small amounts of information, in contrast to page-shaped tablets, which summarised multiple records. To make palm-leaf tablets, wet clay was pressed into a flat sheet, which was then folded. The left and right sides of the folded tablet were flattened, either by pushing them against a flat surface, folding them again or by pressing them between the fingers and palm to produce a narrow, rounded edge. The writing surface was then smoothed, probably by pressing it against a flat surface, and the back of the tablet, which would have joins from where the tablet had previously been folded, was itself smoothed out. In some cases, the tablet was formed around a piece of straw or string, which helped to keep it together if it were later broken.

Preservation 

Linear B tablets were not intended for long-term storage or use, but primarily used as short-term 'aides-memoire'. They were retained for at most a year, as evidenced by the frequent use of words like za-we-te ('this year') and pe-ru-si-nu-wo ('last year'). It has been suggested that their contents were, in normal circumstances, transferred to other materials such as papyrus or parchment for long-term storage. It is thought that the clay tablets would normally have been discarded after such a transfer was complete, and in any case that they were not generally intended to be archived or kept for an extended period: indeed, the site of Pylos is unusual in providing evidence for the systematic sorting and storage of these tablets.

Linear B tablets were not intentionally fired, but were left to dry in the sun. Those Linear B tablets which survive today were accidentally burned during the destruction of the palace in which they happened to be: in the case of Pylos, this destruction happened late in the LH IIIB period, around the transition to LH IIIC (that is). Given that the tablets were normally retained for less than a year, it can be inferred that this destruction took place within months of the creation of PY Ta 641.

Text and translation
The tablet catalogues drinking and storage vessels from the palace at Pylos. A transcription and translation is given below:

Interpretation

PY Ta 641 catalogues an inventory of luxury items, specifically tripods and other vessels. It forms part of the Ta series, which catalogue similar luxury items — furniture, metal vessels and sacrificial implements — of which Hand 2 made an account when the wanax (king) of Pylos appointed a man named Augēwās (Linear B au-ke-wa, perhaps ) as a provincial governor (Linear B da-mo-ko-ro). These items were to be used in what Thomas Palaima calls "a ceremonial and ritually important banqueting ceremony": Dimitri Nakassis has suggested that this may have been a feast to celebrate or commemorate Augēwās' appointment.

It has also been suggested that the broken vessels may have been recorded on the tablet so that they could be repaired, mirroring the tentative evidence for the repair of armour using new pieces of metal in other Pylian Linear B tablets. The attention to detail paid by Hand 2 in recording the quantities, shapes and conditions of vessels has been taken as evidence for the concern paid by the palatial administration to the accuracy of this inventory, as well as for the expertise of Mycenaean scribes in such matters. The record of tablets of "Cretan workmanship" indicates trade connections between Pylos and Crete in the LH IIIB period.

Yves Duhoux has used the relative success with which PY Ta 641 renders a text with a high "social level" (that is, a rich, specialised vocabulary) as evidence for the flexibility of the Linear B script, and its capacity to write much longer texts with different functions to the accounting notes preserved in the surviving tablets.

Discovery

The first Linear B tablets were discovered at Pylos on April 3, 1939, during excavations led by the American archaeologist Carl Blegen and the Greek . The excavation's first trench happened upon an area later known as the Archives Complex, which contained over 600 tablets and fragments. Bill McDonald, who was supervising the digging, spent several days along with Blegen excavating them by hand, receiving his director's tribute in the excavation write-up for his "circumspection, perseverance and long-suffering in spending so many days on his hands and knees in positions of extreme discomfort."

The outbreak of the Second World War suspended excavations at Pylos until 1952. PY Ta 641 was discovered in the same year, in two parts: the first was found on 4 June, and the second on 10 June. The tablet was found in what Blegen called the "chasm", an area at the edge of the Archives Complex filled with loose earth and stones which he considered had once been a wall, dismantled at some point between the medieval and modern period. The "chasm" itself contained around thirty to forty tablets, and a further forty fragments of tablets were found in an extension of the cutting beyond where Blegen considered the original wall to have been. 

Along with the rest of the Ta series, it was found in an area of the Archives Complex used to house tablets which had not yet been processed and filed, making it likely one of the last tablets to enter the archives at Pylos. Upon discovery, it was coated in lime, stored in a locked box and transported in late July to Athens. The tablet would not be cleaned sufficiently to make it legible until 1953, at which point the first photographs of it were taken.

Role in the decipherment of Linear B

The discovery and classification of Linear B (1886–1909) 

Linear B was first identified as a writing system by Arthur Evans, who was shown in 1895 a burnt clay fragment excavated at Kephala Hill, the site of Knossos, with inscribed signs that he correctly recognised as writing. From 1894 onwards, Evans had begun to publish articles in The Journal of Hellenic Studies arguing that these symbols, and other examples on sealstones worn by Cretan women as amulets called galopetres, represented various forms of writing, which he divided into a "pictographic" script and "linear or quasi-alphabetic signs". 

Evans began excavations at Knossos on 23 March 1900. On 30 March, he discovered the first Linear B tablet found at the site, followed by more examples on 4 April and, on 5 April, the first large cache ever large cache of such tablets, among the remains of a wooden box inside a terracotta larnax. During the same 1899–90 season, further caches were uncovered, including over 350 pieces from four boxes in the "Room of the Chariot Tablets". Many of the tablets found throughout Evans' excavations were subsequently damaged or destroyed by water leaks in his storerooms, by poor handling and through disposal by workers who failed to identify them.

By 1900, Evans had categorised the writing of the Knossos tablets as a "linear script", as opposed to what he called the "hieroglyphic or conventionalized pictographic script" now known as Cretan hieroglyphs, and correctly realised that it was written from left to right. He categorised its signs as "for the most part syllabic", though asserted that "a certain number are unquestionably ideographic or determinative."

In 1909, Evans published the first volume of Scripta Minoa, which included the then-unpublished Phaistos Disc, which had been discovered in July 1908, and similarly-unpublished tablets excavated by Federico Halbherr from Hagia Triada. Evans named the script of these tablets as "Class A" and that of the Knossos tablets as "Class B".

Decipherment (1909–1952) 

Most of the Knossos tablets, which numbered around 3500, remained unpublished in Scripta Minoa I. Evans had intended to publish most of them in the second volume, but his attention was occupied until his death in 1941 by the reconstruction and publication of the site of Knossos, as well as his own forays into Balkan diplomacy after the First World War. He published a selection of the tablets in 1935, allowing serious efforts at decipherment to begin. To these were added, after 1939, the first tablets excavated at Pylos. The later decipherers John Chadwick and Michael Ventris, however, considered little of the work done before 1944 to be of substantial value. 

Building on important work by Arthur Cowley and later by Alice Kober, the decipherment of Linear B was completed by Michael Ventris between 1940 and 1952, with a particular "critical period" between 1948 and 18 June 1952. On 1 June, he published a 'Work Note' to a group of Mycenaean scholars arguing that Linear B was used to write Greek. On 18 June, he wrote to Emmett L. Bennett Jr. a letter including the line "I think I've deciphered Linear B". In this letter, Ventris restated his conviction that the language of Linear B was Greek, and gave an account of some of its spelling rules and of certain transliterations between Classical Greek and Linear B. On 1 July, he announced the decipherment on BBC Radio 3.

The role of PY Ta 641 in proving the decipherment 

Ventris' announcement was largely met with scepticism from the scholarly community, including from John Chadwick, who later wrote that he had been "completely taken aback" by the idea that Linear B had been used to write Greek, which he had considered "preposterous". In particular, scholars such as Bennett worried about the possibility of circular reasoning: since Ventris had not tested his decipherment on any unseen material, it would have been possible for him to shape his 'solution' in order to fit the available data, whether or not it was correct.

On 16 May 1953, Blegen sent Ventris a copy of PY Ta 641, in which he drew attention to the correspondence between the ideograms used for vases on the tablet and the corresponding adjectives given by reading the tablet with Ventris' values for the syllabograms. In his letter, he wrote "all this seems too good to be true. Is coincidence excluded?"

By early July, Chadwick had obtained a copy of Ventris' decipherment from R. A. B. Mynors, and become convinced of its accuracy. On 13 July, he wrote to Ventris, offering his help as a "mere philologist" in charting the development of the Greek language between Mycenaean and the better-known Archaic and Classical dialects. Another early sceptic of the idea that Linear B encoded Greek, Sterling Dow, changed his mind by October 1952 after Ventris and Bennett shared with him the news of PY Ta 641: he was particularly influenced by the fact that Ventris had completed his decipherment before seeing the tablet, and that Blegen had been the only person to see the tablet when he had used Ventris' sign-values to read it. John Chadwick is quoted as saying "Greeks should be grateful to this tiny piece of charred clay, because it proved that the Linear B language is Greek."

Objections to Ventris' decipherment 

By April 1954, when both Ventris and Dow wrote articles in The New York Times publicising the decipherment, most Anglophone scholars accepted it as correct. A minority, notably Chadwick's former lecturer Arthur J. Beattie — then in post at the University of Edinburgh — continued to doubt its validity. Shortly after Ventris' death in 1956, Beattie published an article in the Journal of Hellenic Studies which conceded that "this text [PY Ta 641] has probably done more than anything else to convince classical scholars that Mr. Ventris' decipherment is right." Beattie argued that "the apparent correspondence between words and ideograms is due to chance", and an artefact of the multiple possibilities offered by Ventris for the pronunciation of each Linear B sign.

Chadwick responded to Beattie's article in 1957, with a riposte, later described as "brief but effective", in the same journal. He rejected Beattie's objections, wrote of the "rapidity and unanimity" with which the decipherment had been accepted among the scholarly community, and concluded with "Professor Beattie underestimates the size of the windmill at which he is tilting." In 1958, Beattie alleged that Ventris had seen a copy or photograph of PY Ta 641 before finalising his decipherment, and then fraudulently presented the tablet as independent evidence of its validity. Blegen, however, affirmed that the tablet had been locked away until late July, after Ventris had stated his conviction of the Greek solution to Linear B in June, and had remained illegible until the following year. Finally, in 1959, Beattie claimed that Ventris had seen, and subsequently destroyed, a similar tablet to PY Ta 641 prior to making his decipherment — a claim which the Mycenaean philologists  and Anna Morpurgo Davies later described as "outrageous".

Beattie's arguments attracted only small-scale support, primarily in Scotland. By 1960, English-speaking scholars generally accepted the decipherment, though Leonard Palmer wrote in 1965 of widespread "agnosticism" as to whether the matter could be considered 'proven'. By the 1980s, the decipherment was almost universally accepted, though it continued to be controversial in German-speaking scholarship until the early 1990s.

Footnotes

Explanatory notes

References

Bibliography

 
 
 
 
 
 
 
 
 
 
 
 
 
 
 
 
 
 
 
 
 
 
 
 
 
 
 
 
 
 
 
 
 
 
 
 
 
 
 
 
 
 
 
  
 
 

1952 archaeological discoveries
Clay tablets
Pylos
Mycenaean Greek inscriptions